Labrit is a commune in the Landes department in Nouvelle-Aquitaine in south-western France. As of 2018, it has a population of 861, Making it the least populous Canton seat of all Departments in France.

It was the original seat of the lords of Albret.

See also
Communes of the Landes department
Parc naturel régional des Landes de Gascogne

References

Communes of Landes (department)